Rome, Kansas may refer to:

 Rome, Ellis County, Kansas — ghost town
 Rome, Sumner County, Kansas — unincorporated community